KHIX (96.7 FM, "Mix 96.7") is a radio station licensed to serve Carlin, Nevada. The station is owned by Global One Media Inc. It airs a hot adult contemporary music format.

The station was assigned the KHIX call letters by the Federal Communications Commission on May 15, 1998.

Current radio hosts
Sandy Beeler: 5:00 - 9:00 (Weekdays)

Bryan Simmons: 2:00 PM - 6:00 PM (Weekdays)

Current shows
American Top 40, Hosted by Ryan Seacrest. 6:00 - 10:00 (Saturday) 10:00 - 2:00 PM (Sunday)

References

External links
KHIX official website

HIX
Hot adult contemporary radio stations in the United States
Elko County, Nevada